Tibthorpe is a village and civil parish in the East Riding of Yorkshire, England. According to the 2011 UK census, Tibthorpe parish had a population of 157, a decrease on the 2001 UK census figure of 162.
High Wood and Low Wood to the south are a haven for wildlife.

The village has a long history stretching back to before the Domesday Book when it was known as Tibetorp.  It is recorded that centuries ago monks from Watton Abbey pastured sheep around the village and could rest at a 'chapel of ease' located in the village.

The village has no pub, school or church. There was once a Methodist Chapel, built in 1823, that was demolished some years ago, along with a number of 18th century cottages, during road construction.

In the past several small businesses flourished in the village, including a cobbler, a fishmonger, a milkman, a butcher and a fruiterer as well as a village store and blacksmith.

References

External links

"Kirkburn: Geographical and Historical information from the year 1892 (Bulmers')" (includes Tibthorpe), Genuki.org.uk. Retrieved 16 April 2012

Villages in the East Riding of Yorkshire
Civil parishes in the East Riding of Yorkshire